Bangladesh Udichi Shilpigoshthi is the largest cultural organisation in Bangladesh. The organisation's goal is the struggle to build what it deems a just, free, and equal society. It was organised in East Pakistan by revolutionary novelists Satyen Sen, Ranesh Das Gupta along with numerous youths in 1968, and through 1971 it operated a cultural campaign.  At the opening of the Bangladesh Liberation War, its members fought for independence.  In 2013, the organisation was awarded the Ekushey Padak, the country's most prestigious award.

References

1968 establishments in East Pakistan
Recipients of the Ekushey Padak
Cultural organisations based in Bangladesh